Kaipan is a small Czech vehicle manufacturer in Smržovka focused on producing roadsters.

History 

The company was founded in 1992, but the first car, Kaipan 47 based on Lotus Seven (1957-1972), has been manufactured since 1997. Later it was replaced by modified type 57 with Volkswagen engine 1.8 20V Turbo. 

In 2006, Kaipan uncovered the first model with their original bodywork, Kaipan 14. They have engine from Favorit and the production process is provided as a rebuilding of the prime car. Kaipan 14 was also shipped to Germany, Netherlands, Serbia, Montenegro and Slovakia. In 2008, Kaipan 15 with newer Škoda engine was introduced. Until 2011, around 340 of these cars were made. Kaipan 14 kit (excluding parts from Favorit) cost 235,000 CZK, the price of already assembled version of Kaipan 15 was 499,000 CZK. 

In the beginning of 2012, production of brand new type 16 has started. It has a new stronger Škoda engine, it fulfills Euro 5 emission standards and giving a top speed of 189 km/h. Today, the company produces models: 14, 16 and 57. In 2018, Kaipan 57a was introduced, among the major innovations is compliance with the Euro 6 emission standard.

Models

See also
List of Czech automobiles

References

External links 
Kaipan official webside

Vehicle manufacturing companies established in 1992
Car manufacturers of the Czech Republic
Czech brands